Max Bulla (September 26, 1905 – March 1, 1990) was an Austrian professional road bicycle racer. In the 1931 Tour de France, Bulla won three stages and wore the yellow jersey for one day. He eventually finished the Tour in 15th place overall and won the classification for independent riders. Bulla finished fifth overall and won two stages at the 1935 Vuelta a España. He was born in Vienna and died in Pitten.

When Bulla won the second stage of the 1931 Tour de France and took the yellow jersey, the cyclists in the Tour de France were divided into national teams and touriste-routiers. The best cyclists were in the national teams, and the semi-amateurs were touriste-routiers. Bulla was a touriste-routier. In that second stage, the touriste-routiers started 10 minutes later than the national teams. Still, Bulla overtook the national teams, won the stage and took the lead, the only time in history that a touriste-routier was leading the Tour de France.

Major results

 1926
 1st, National Road Championships
 1927
 1st, National Road Championships
 1931
 1st, Stage 15, Deutschland Tour, Trier
 1st, Züri-Metzgete
 15th Overall, Tour de France
 1st, Overall Independents
 1st, Stage 2, Caen—Dinan
 3rd, Stage 4, Brest—Vannes
 3rd, Stage 5, Vannes—Les Sables d'Olonne
 2nd, Stage 7, Bordeaux—Bayonne
 2nd, Stage 10, Luchon—Perpignan
 1st, Stage 12, Perpignan—Marseille
 1st, Stage 17, Montpellier—Aix-les-Bains
 1931
 1st, Tour du Lac Léman
 1933
 1st, Overall, Tour de Suisse
 1st, Stage 2, Lucerne
 1st, Stage 3, Geneva
 1934
 1st, Stage 5, Tour de Suisse, Berne
1935
 5th Overall, Vuelta a España
 1st, Stage 8, Valencia
 1st, Stage 10, Granada
 1936
 1st, Stage 7, Tour de Suisse, Zürich

References

External links 

Austrian male cyclists
Austrian Tour de France stage winners
Austrian Vuelta a España stage winners
1905 births
1990 deaths
Cyclists from Vienna
Tour de Suisse stage winners
20th-century Austrian people